Tatiele Roberta de Carvalho (born 22 November 1989) is a Brazilian long-distance runner. She competed at the 2016 Summer Olympics in Rio de Janeiro, in the women's 10,000 metres.

References

External links

1989 births
Living people
Brazilian female long-distance runners
Olympic athletes of Brazil
Athletes (track and field) at the 2016 Summer Olympics
Athletes (track and field) at the 2018 South American Games
South American Games silver medalists for Brazil
South American Games medalists in athletics
Pan American Games athletes for Brazil
Athletes (track and field) at the 2019 Pan American Games
Sportspeople from Minas Gerais
20th-century Brazilian women
21st-century Brazilian women